The 2017–18 Minnesota Timberwolves season was the 29th season of the franchise in the National Basketball Association (NBA).

They clinched their first winning season since 2004 with a win over the New York Knicks on March 23, 2018. On April 11, 2018, the Timberwolves clinched a playoff berth for the first time since 2004 with a win over the Denver Nuggets, ending what was the longest post-season drought in the NBA at the time, at 13 seasons to pass the Sacramento Kings to currently make the longest postseason NBA drought. The last time the Wolves made the playoffs was during the Kevin Garnett era where he led them to the Conference Finals that year. The Wolves this season also signed free agent Derrick Rose, after he considered joining teams such as the Golden State Warriors, San Antonio Spurs, and Washington Wizards. The signing reunited Rose with former Chicago Bulls teammates Jimmy Butler and Taj Gibson, as well as coach Tom Thibodeau, all of whom were part of the franchise from 2011-2015. These acquisitions would earn the team the nickname “TimberBulls” from the media and fans.

They finished the regular season with a 47–35 record, which clinched the 8th seed. In the playoffs, the Timberwolves faced the top-seeded Houston Rockets in the first round, and lost in five games.

Until 2022, this was the last season that the Timberwolves made the playoffs or had a winning season.

Draft

Entering the draft, the Timberwolves only held one first round pick at #7; their second round pick was forced to be traded away to the Boston Celtics due to a previous trade involving the Phoenix Suns (and former New Orleans Hornets) allowing the Suns (later Celtics) to acquire their 2017 second round pick if their lottery protected pick wasn't acquired by 2016. Exiting draft night, however, they traded away their #7 pick, which was the Finnish center/power forward Lauri Markkanen from University of Arizona, alongside last year's top selection (Kris Dunn) and Zach LaVine to the Chicago Bulls in exchange for All-Star shooting guard/small forward Jimmy Butler and the Bulls' own first round selection, which was #16 pick Justin Patton, a redshirt freshman center from Creighton University for the purpose of ending their 13 year long playoff drought.

Roster

Standings

Division

Conference

Game log

Preseason

|- style="background:#bfb;"
| 1
| September 30
| @ LA Lakers
| 
| Shabazz Muhammad (22)
| Gorgui Dieng (12)
| Jeff Teague (9)
| Honda Center18,000
| 1–0
|- style="background:#bfb;"
| 2
| October 5
| @ Golden State
| 
| Butler, Towns (16)
| Gorgui Dieng (10)
| Tyus Jones (6)
| Shenzhen Universiade Sports Centre17,495
| 2–0
|- style="background:#fbb;"
| 3
| October 8
| Golden State
| 
| Andrew Wiggins (19)
| Cole Aldrich (6)
| Jimmy Butler (7)
| Mercedes-Benz ArenaN/A
| 2–1

Regular season

|- style="background:#fcc;"
| 1
| October 18
| @ San Antonio
| 
| Andrew Wiggins (26)
| Karl-Anthony Towns (13)
| Jeff Teague (6)
| AT&T Center18,418
| 0–1
|- style="background:#cfc;"
| 2
| October 20
| Utah
| 
| Karl-Anthony Towns (20)
| Karl-Anthony Towns (10)
| Tyus Jones (5)
| Target Center18,978
| 1–1
|- style="background:#cfc;"
| 3
| October 22
| @ Oklahoma City
| 
| Towns, Wiggins (27)
| Karl-Anthony Towns (13)
| Jeff Teague (9)
| Chesapeake Energy Arena18,203
| 2–1
|- style="background:#fcc;"
| 4
| October 24
| Indiana
| 
| Karl-Anthony Towns (28)
| Karl-Anthony Towns (7)
| Jamal Crawford (9)
| Target Center14,353
| 2–2
|- style="background:#fcc;"
| 5
| October 25
| @ Detroit
| 
| Karl-Anthony Towns (23)
| Karl-Anthony Towns (10)
| Jeff Teague (6)
| Little Caesars Arena13,790
| 2–3
|- style="background:#cfc;"
| 6
| October 27
| Oklahoma City
| 
| Karl-Anthony Towns (33)
| Karl-Anthony Towns (19)
| Jeff Teague (10)
| Target Center17,620
| 3–3
|- style="background:#cfc;"
| 7
| October 30
| @ Miami
| 
| Jeff Teague (23)
| Karl-Anthony Towns (12)
| Jeff Teague (11)
| American Airlines Arena19,600
| 4–3

|- style="background:#cfc;"
| 8
| November 1
| @ New Orleans
| 
| Jimmy Butler (23)
| Taj Gibson (12)
| Jeff Teague (9)
| Smoothie King Center14,788
| 5–3
|- style="background:#cfc;"
| 9
| November 4
| Dallas
| 
| Karl-Anthony Towns (31)
| Karl-Anthony Towns (12)
| Jeff Teague (10)
| Target Center16,837
| 6–3
|- style="background:#cfc;"
| 10
| November 5
| Charlotte
| 
| Andrew Wiggins (20)
| Gorgui Dieng (11)
| Jeff Teague (12)
| Target Center14,124
| 7–3
|- style="background:#fcc;"
| 11
| November 8
| @ Golden State
| 
| Karl-Anthony Towns (16)
| Karl-Anthony Towns (12)
| Butler, Jeff Teague (5)
| Oracle Arena19,596
| 7–4
|- style="background:#fcc;"
| 12
| November 11
| @ Phoenix
| 
| Andrew Wiggins (27)
| Karl-Anthony Towns (12)
| Butler, Jeff Teague (5)
| Talking Stick Resort Arena16,910
| 7–5
|- style="background:#cfc;"
| 13
| November 13
| @ Utah
| 
| Karl-Anthony Towns (24)
| Karl-Anthony Towns (13)
| Jimmy Butler (10)
| Vivint Smart Home Arena17,236
| 8–5
|- style="background:#cfc;"
| 14
| November 15
| San Antonio
| 
| Karl-Anthony Towns (26)
| Karl-Anthony Towns (16)
| Jeff Teague (6)
| Target Center18,978
| 9–5
|- style="background:#cfc;"
| 15
| November 17
| @ Dallas
| 
| Jimmy Butler (21)
| Gibson, Towns (11)
| Jeff Teague (10)
| American Airlines Center19,459
| 10–5
|- style="background:#fcc;"
| 16
| November 19
| Detroit
| 
| Jimmy Butler (26)
| Jimmy Butler (9)
| Jeff Teague (9)
| Target Center16,069
| 10–6
|- style="background:#fcc;"
| 17
| November 20
| @ Charlotte
| 
| Jamal Crawford (19)
| Karl-Anthony Towns (12)
| Tyus Jones (3)
| Spectrum Center15,978
| 10–7
|- style="background:#cfc;"
| 18
| November 22
| Orlando
| 
| Jimmy Butler (26)
| Karl-Anthony Towns (13)
| Jeff Teague (11)
| Target Center16,402
| 11–7
|- style="background:#fcc;"
| 19
| November 24
| Miami
| 
| Butler, Towns, Wiggins (18)
| Karl-Anthony Towns (11)
| Tyus Jones (6)
| Target Center18,978
| 11–8
|- style="background:#cfc;"
| 20
| November 26
| Phoenix
| 
| Karl-Anthony Towns (32)
| Taj Gibson (14)
| Tyus Jones (7)
| Target Center16,448
| 12–8
|- style="background:#fcc;"
| 21
| November 28
| Washington
| 
| Karl-Anthony Towns (20)
| Karl-Anthony Towns (17)
| Jimmy Butler (10)
| Target Center13,442
| 12–9
|- style="background:#cfc;"
| 22
| November 29
| @ New Orleans
| 
| Andrew Wiggins (28)
| Gibson, Towns (10)
| Tyus Jones (6)
| Smoothie King Center15,555
| 13–9

|- style="background:#fcc;"
| 23
| December 1
| @ Oklahoma City
| 
| Towns, Wiggins (23)
| Karl-Anthony Towns (9)
| Jeff Teague (10)
| Chesapeake Energy Arena18,203
| 13–10
|- style="background:#cfc;"
| 24
| December 3
| LA Clippers
| 
| Jimmy Butler (33)
| Karl-Anthony Towns (12)
| Jeff Teague (10)
| Target Center13,172
| 14–10
|- style="background:#fcc;"
| 25
| December 4
| @ Memphis
| 
| Jimmy Butler (30)
| Karl-Anthony Towns (11)
| Jimmy Butler (5)
| FedExForum14,012
| 14–11
|- style="background:#cfc;"
| 26
| December 6
| @ LA Clippers
| 
| Karl-Anthony Towns (21)
| Taj Gibson (14)
| Jimmy Butler (8)
| Staples Center15,951
| 15–11
|-style="background:#cfc;"
| 27
| December 10
| Dallas
| 
| Karl-Anthony Towns (28)
| Karl-Anthony Towns (12)
| Butler, Jeff Teague (5)
| Target Center13,094
| 16–11
|- style="background:#fcc;"
| 28
| December 12
| Philadelphia
| 
| Jimmy Butler (38)
| Karl-Anthony Towns (16)
| Jamal Crawford (5)
| Target Center14,659
| 16–12
|- style="background:#cfc;"
| 29
| December 14
| Sacramento
| 
| Karl-Anthony Towns (30)
| Karl-Anthony Towns (14)
| Jimmy Butler (9)
| Target Center11,126
| 17–12
|- style="background:#fcc;"
| 30
| December 16
| Phoenix
| 
| Karl-Anthony Towns (28)
| Karl-Anthony Towns (11)
| Jeff Teague (8)
| Target Center18,109
| 17–13
|- style="background:#cfc;"
| 31
| December 18
| Portland
| 
| Jimmy Butler (37)
| Karl-Anthony Towns (8)
| Jeff Teague (5)
| Target Center14,187
| 18–13
|- style="background:#cfc;"
| 32
| December 20
| @ Denver
| 
| Butler, Towns (25)
| Karl-Anthony Towns (10)
| Jeff Teague (8)
| Pepsi Center17,002
| 19–13
|- style="background:#cfc;"
| 33
| December 23
| @ Phoenix
| 
| Jimmy Butler (32)
| Karl-Anthony Towns (14)
| Jeff Teague (6)
| Talking Stick Resort Arena16,482
| 20–13
|- style="background:#cfc;"
| 34
| December 25
| @ LA Lakers
| 
| Butler, Gibson (23)
| Karl-Anthony Towns (10)
| Jeff Teague (10)
| Staples Center18,997
| 21–13
|- style="background:#cfc;"
| 35
| December 27
| Denver
| 
| Jimmy Butler (39)
| Karl-Anthony Towns (13)
| Jeff Teague (10)
| Target Center18,978
| 22–13
|- style="background:#fcc;"
| 36
| December 28
| @ Milwaukee
| 
| Karl-Anthony Towns (22)
| Gorgui Dieng (8)
| Jimmy Butler (7)
| Bradley Center18,717
| 22–14
|- style="background:#cfc;"
| 37
| December 31
| @ Indiana
| 
| Jimmy Butler (26)
| Karl-Anthony Towns (14)
| Jeff Teague (6)
| Bankers Life Fieldhouse17,923
| 23–14

|- style="background:#cfc;"
| 38
| January 1
| LA Lakers
| 
| Jimmy Butler (28)
| Karl-Anthony Towns (13)
| Jeff Teague (9)
| Target Center18,978
| 24–14
|- style="background:#fcc;"
| 39
| January 3
| @ Brooklyn
| 
| Jimmy Butler (30)
| Karl-Anthony Towns (10)
| Jimmy Butler (4)
| Barclays Center16,215
| 24–15
|- style="background:#fcc;"
| 40
| January 5
| @ Boston
| 
| Karl-Anthony Towns (25)
| Karl-Anthony Towns (23)
| Jimmy Butler (6)
| TD Garden18,624
| 24–16
|- style="background:#cfc;"
| 41
| January 6
| New Orleans
| 
| Karl-Anthony Towns (21)
| Karl-Anthony Towns (16)
| Jimmy Butler (8)
| Target Center18,978
| 25–16
|- style="background:#cfc;"
| 42
| January 8
| Cleveland
| 
| Andrew Wiggins (25)
| Taj Gibson (13)
| Jimmy Butler (9)
| Target Center18,978
| 26–16
|- style="background:#cfc;"
| 43
| January 10
| Oklahoma City
| 
| Jimmy Butler (26)
| Karl-Anthony Towns (12)
| Jimmy Butler (8)
| Target Center18,978
| 27–16
|- style="background:#cfc;"
| 44
| January 12
| NY Knicks
| 
| Karl-Anthony Towns (23)
| Karl-Anthony Towns (15)
| Karl-Anthony Towns (9)
| Target Center18,978
| 28–16
|- style="background:#cfc;"
| 45
| January 14
| Portland
| 
| Jimmy Butler (24)
| Karl-Anthony Towns (11)
| Jeff Teague (8)
| Target Center14,739
| 29–16
|- style="background:#fcc;"
| 46
| January 16
| @ Orlando
| 
| Jimmy Butler (28)
| Karl-Anthony Towns (12)
| Jeff Teague (6)
| Amway Center18,589
| 29–17
|- style="background:#fcc;"
| 47
| January 18
| @ Houston
| 
| Jimmy Butler (23)
| Karl-Anthony Towns (13)
| Jamal Crawford (5)
| Toyota Center18,055
| 29–18
|- style="background:#cfc;"
| 48
| January 20
| Toronto
| 
| Andrew Wiggins (29)
| Karl-Anthony Towns (10)
| Jeff Teague (10)
| Target Center17,828
| 30–18
|- style="background:#cfc;"
| 49
| January 22
| @ LA Clippers
| 
| Andrew Wiggins (40)
| Karl-Anthony Towns (17)
| Jeff Teague (6)
| Staples Center16,347
| 31–18
|- style="background:#fcc;"
| 50
| January 24
| @ Portland
| 
| Andrew Wiggins (24)
| Karl-Anthony Towns (9)
| Crawford, Jones (5)
| Moda Center18,920
| 31–19
|- style="background:#fcc;"
| 51
| January 25
| @ Golden State
| 
| Karl-Anthony Towns (31)
| Karl-Anthony Towns (15)
| Crawford, Towns (5)
| Oracle Arena19,596
| 31–20
|- style="background:#cfc;"
| 52
| January 27
| Brooklyn
| 
| Butler, Wiggins (21)
| Karl-Anthony Towns (19)
| Butler, Jones (5)
| Target Center16,231
| 32–20
|- style="background:#fcc;"
| 53
| January 29
| @ Atlanta
| 
| Jimmy Butler (24)
| Karl-Anthony Towns (13)
| Jeff Teague (10)
| Philips Arena12,589
| 32–21
|- style="background:#fcc;"
| 54
| January 30
| @ Toronto
| 
| Jimmy Butler (25)
| Karl-Anthony Towns (10)
| Jimmy Butler (6)
| Air Canada Centre19,800
| 32–22

|- style="background:#cfc;"
| 55
| February 1
| Milwaukee
| 
| Jimmy Butler (28)
| Karl-Anthony Towns (11)
| Jeff Teague (8)
| Target Center17,199
| 33–22
|- style="background:#cfc;"
| 56
| February 3
| New Orleans
| 
| Jimmy Butler (30)
| Karl-Anthony Towns (16)
| Jimmy Butler (7)
| Target Center17,954
| 34–22
|- style="background:#fcc;"
| 57
| February 7
| @ Cleveland
| 
| Jimmy Butler (35)
| Karl-Anthony Towns (10)
| Jeff Teague (15)
| Quicken Loans Arena20,562
| 34–23
|- style="background:#fcc;"
| 58
| February 9
| @ Chicago
| 
| Jimmy Butler (38)
| Karl-Anthony Towns (10)
| Butler, Teague (5)
| United Center21,558
| 34–24
|- style="background:#cfc;"
| 59
| February 11
| Sacramento
| 
| Karl-Anthony Towns (29)
| Towns, Wiggins (8)
| Jeff Teague (9)
| Target Center18,068
| 35–24
|- style="background:#fcc;"
| 60
| February 13
| Houston
| 
| Karl-Anthony Towns (35)
| Karl-Anthony Towns (12)
| Jeff Teague (8)
| Target Center18,978
| 35–25
|- style="background:#cfc;"
| 61
| February 15
| LA Lakers
| 
| Taj Gibson (28)
| Karl-Anthony Towns (19)
| Jeff Teague (6)
| Target Center17,534
| 36–25
|- align="center"
|colspan="9" bgcolor="#bbcaff"|All-Star Break
|- style="background:#fcc;"
| 62
| February 23
| @ Houston
| 
| Andrew Wiggins (21)
| Karl-Anthony Towns (13)
| Jeff Teague (4)
| Toyota Center18,055
| 36–26
|- style="background:#cfc;"
| 63
| February 24
| Chicago
| 
| Jeff Teague (25)
| Karl-Anthony Towns (13)
| Jeff Teague (7)
| Target Center18,978
| 37–26
|- style="background:#cfc;"
| 64
| February 26
| @ Sacramento
| 
| Karl-Anthony Towns (26)
| Karl-Anthony Towns (17)
| Jeff Teague (7)
| Golden 1 Center17,583
| 38–26

|- style="background:#fcc;"
| 65
| March 1
| @ Portland
| 
| Karl-Anthony Towns (34)
| Karl-Anthony Towns (17)
| Jeff Teague (5)
| Moda Center19,533
| 38–27
|- style="background:#fcc;"
| 66
| March 2
| @ Utah
| 
| Andrew Wiggins (27)
| Bjelica, Gibson, Teague, Towns (4)
| Jamal Crawford (4)
| Vivint Smart Home Arena18,306
| 38–28
|- style="background:#fcc;"
| 67
| March 8
| Boston
| 
| Nemanja Bjelica (30)
| Nemanja Bjelica (12)
| Jeff Teague (8)
| Target Center18,978
| 38–29
|- style="background:#cfc;"
| 68
| March 11
| Golden State
| 
| Karl-Anthony Towns (31)
| Karl-Anthony Towns (16)
| Jeff Teague (10)
| Target Center18,978
| 39–29
|- style="background:#cfc;"
| 69
| March 13
| @ Washington
| 
| Karl-Anthony Towns (37)
| Karl-Anthony Towns (10)
| Nemanja Bjelica (7)
| Capital One Arena17,078
| 40–29
|- style="background:#fcc;"
| 70
| March 17
| @ San Antonio
| 
| Karl-Anthony Towns (23)
| Karl-Anthony Towns (9)
| Jeff Teague (8)
| AT&T Center18,418
| 40–30
|- style="background:#fcc;"
| 71
| March 18
| Houston
| 
| Jeff Teague (23)
| Karl-Anthony Towns (18)
| Jeff Teague (11)
| Target Center18,978
| 40–31
|- style="background:#cfc;"
| 72
| March 20
| LA Clippers
| 
| Karl-Anthony Towns (30)
| Karl-Anthony Towns (10)
| Jeff Teague (12)
| Target Center16,351
| 41–31
|- style="background:#cfc;"
| 73
| March 23
| @ NY Knicks
|
| Karl-Anthony Towns (24)
| Karl-Anthony Towns (13)
| Jeff Teague (8)
| Madison Square Garden18,914
| 42–31
|- style="background:#fcc;"
| 74
| March 24
| @ Philadelphia
| 
| Andrew Wiggins (16)
| Karl-Anthony Towns (11)
| Tyus Jones (6)
| Wells Fargo Center20,668
| 42–32
|- style="background:#fcc;"
| 75
| March 26
| Memphis
| 
| Jeff Teague (25)
| Karl-Anthony Towns (12)
| Jeff Teague (7)
| Target Center16,290
| 42–33
|- style="background:#cfc;"
| 76
| March 28
| Atlanta
| 
| Karl-Anthony Towns (56)
| Karl-Anthony Towns (15)
| Jeff Teague (8)
| Target Center16,183
| 43–33
|- style="background:#cfc;"
| 77
| March 30
| @ Dallas
| 
| Karl-Anthony Towns (21)
| Karl-Anthony Towns (20)
| Tyus Jones (4)
| American Airlines Center20,244
| 44–33

|- style="background:#fcc;"
| 78
| April 1
| Utah
|
| Andrew Wiggins (23)
| Karl-Anthony Towns (7)
| Jones, Wiggins (4)
| Target Center18,978
| 44–34
|- style="background:#fcc;"
| 79
| April 5
| @ Denver
| 
| Karl-Anthony Towns (26)
| Taj Gibson (14)
| Jeff Teague (6)
| Pepsi Center16,415
| 44–35
|- style="background:#cfc;"
| 80
| April 6
| @ LA Lakers
| 
| Jeff Teague (25)
| Karl-Anthony Towns (11)
| Jeff Teague (8)
| Staples Center18,997
| 45–35
|- style="background:#cfc;"
| 81
| April 9
| Memphis
| 
| Teague, Towns (25)
| Karl-Anthony Towns (18)
| Jeff Teague (8)
| Target Center17,641
| 46–35
|- style="background:#cfc;"
| 82
| April 11
| Denver
| 
| Jimmy Butler (31)
| Karl-Anthony Towns (14)
| Jeff Teague (7)
| Target Center18,978
| 47–35

Playoffs

|- style="background:#fcc;"
| 1
| April 15
| @ Houston
| 
| Andrew Wiggins (18)
| Karl-Anthony Towns (12)
| Jeff Teague (8)
| Toyota Center18,055
| 0–1
|- style="background:#fcc;"
| 2
| April 18
| @ Houston
| 
| Nemanja Bjelica (16)
| Karl-Anthony Towns (10)
| Jones, Wiggins (3)
| Toyota Center18,055
| 0–2
|- style="background:#cfc;"
| 3
| April 21
| Houston
| 
| Jimmy Butler (28)
| Karl-Anthony Towns (16)
| Jeff Teague (8)
| Target Center18,978
| 1–2
|- style="background:#fcc;"
| 4
| April 23
| Houston
| 
| Karl-Anthony Towns (22)
| Karl-Anthony Towns (15)
| Butler, Teague (5)
| Target Center18,978
| 1–3
|- style="background:#fcc;"
| 5
| April 25
| @ Houston
| 
| Karl-Anthony Towns (23)
| Karl-Anthony Towns (14)
| Jeff Teague (7)
| Toyota Center18,055
| 1–4

Transactions

Trades

Free agents

Re-signed

Additions

Subtractions

References

2017-18
Minnesota
2017 in sports in Minnesota
2018 in sports in Minnesota